Death of a Gossip is a mystery novel by M. C. Beaton (Marion Chesney), first published in 1985.  It is set in the fictional town of Lochdubh, Scotland and is the first novel of a series featuring the local constable Hamish Macbeth.

Plot 
Eight people of varied background meet in the fictional village of Lochdubh in Northern Scotland. They attend the Lochdubh School of Casting : Salmon and Trout Fishing, owned and operated by John Cartwright and his wife Heather. What should be a relaxing holiday amid glorious Highland lochs and mountains becomes a misery. One of the party, Lady Jane Withers, a society widow and notorious gossip columnist, upsets everyone with her snobbishness, sharp tongue and rudeness. Lady Jane soon learns that each of her fellow guests has a secret in their past that they would prefer to remain unknown. When her Ladyship is found dead in Keeper's Pool, no-one is surprised and everyone is relieved.

Hamish Macbeth, Lochdubh's local policeman, has to search for a murderer amongst the many suspects. No-one is willing to talk. With the assistance of Priscilla Halburton-Smythe, the love of his life, Hamish solves the mystery in his usual unorthodox style. Hamish's success does not endear him to Chief Inspector Blair, a senior detective from the nearby fictional town of Strathbane.

Characters 

 John Cartwright: Owner of the Lochdubh School of Casting: Salmon and Trout Fishing
 Heather Cartwright: Wife of John, joint manager of the school, believed to be the better angler
 Hamish Macbeth: Lochdubh's village constable
 Mr. Marvin Roth: A wealthy American from New York who is planning to run for office
 Mrs. Amy Roth: the wealthy American’s wife, related to an old Southern family 
 Lady Jane Winders: Widow of a Labour Peer; she is "The Gossip"; a gossip columnist for newspaper
 Jeremy Blythe: A barrister from London
 Alice Wilson: A secretary from London
 Charlie Baxter: A twelve-year-old from Manchester with divorced parents
 Major Peter Frame: Former army officer, the only member of the class with prior fishing experience
 Daphene Gore: A debutante from Oxford
 Priscilla Halburton-Smythe: The daughter of a wealthy local landowner

Genre 

Death of a Gossip is a slightly modified version of an English Drawing Room Mystery. This type of mystery brings together a group of people, one of the group is murdered and the detective, private investigator or amateur sleuth solves the crime by careful observation of the group. At the end of the novel they are all brought together in a drawing room where one by one each person is shown to be innocent and the guilty party is exposed.

Publication history 

 1985, USA, St. Martin's Press , Pub Date March 1985, Hardcover
 1988, USA, Fawcett Publications publisher , Pub date 12 April 1988, Mass Market Paperback
 1999, USA, Grand Central Publishing, Pub Date 01 Feb 1999, Mass Market Paperback
 1989, UK, Savannah Koch publisher, Pub Date 5 August 1989, Hardcover
 1994, UK, Bantam Books, London, Pub Date 28 July 1994, Paperback
 2008, UK, Robinson Publishing, Pub Date 23 April 2008, Paperback
 2013, UK, C & R Crime, Pub Date 2013, Paperback

External links
 Death of a Gossip web page on UK publisher Constable & Robinson's web site.

Footnotes

1985 British novels
British detective novels
British mystery novels
Hamish Macbeth series
Novels set in Highland (council area)
St. Martin's Press books